WBRF (98.1 MHz) is a commercial FM radio station licensed to Galax, Virginia, and serving Southwestern Virginia, Southside Virginia and the western Piedmont Triad, including Winston-Salem.  It is owned and operated by Blue Ridge Radio, Inc., with studios and offices on Poplar Knob Road in Galax.  WBRF plays a mix of Classic country, Bluegrass and Americana music.  Most programming is simulcast on WKBA 1550 and 93.1 in the Roanoke metropolitan area.

WBRF has an effective radiated power (ERP) of 100,000 watts horizontal polarization and 96,000 watts vertical.  The transmitter is on Fishers Peak Road in Lowgap, North Carolina, near the Virginia border.

History
The original call sign was WBOB-FM, with a power of 6,000 watts. WBOB-FM shared studios with WBOB-AM (now WCGX).

WBOB-FM began its Country/Bluegrass/Americana format around the same time it was purchased by Blue Ridge Radio Inc. in April 1985.  At the same time, the station switched its call sign to WBRF.

In 1990, the power was increased to 100,000 watts and the transmitter moved to Fishers Peak in Surry County, near the Virginia - North Carolina border.

On June 15, 2009, air personality Toby Young returned to radio with his "Aunt Eloise" character who was part of WTQR radio for 23 years.

Beginning in January 2023, WBRF started simulcasting most of its programming on co-owned WKBA 1550 and 93.1 in the Roanoke metropolitan area.

Programming
WBRF-FM broadcasts the classic country music show, "Blue Ridge Back Roads", live from the Rex Theater in Galax weekly. It also broadcasts from the Old Fiddler's Convention every August in Felt's Park, also in Galax.

The station is the flagship station of Wake Forest Demon Deacons football and men's basketball. However, since the station provides marginal coverage to much of the Triad, the Deacons also air their games on WPOL in Winston-Salem and simulcast partner WKEW in Greensboro.

References

External links
 Classic Country 98-1 Online
 

1961 establishments in Virginia
Classic country radio stations in the United States
Radio stations established in 1961
BRF
Americana radio stations